Bir Bikrom is the third highest gallantry award in Bangladesh. Like the other gallantry awards, this was introduced immediately after the Bangladeshi Liberation War. Bir Bikrom was awarded to 175 fighters.

Recipients
175 fighters have been awarded on 15 December 1973 for their heroic actions at the Liberation War of Bangladesh in 1971. The government of Bangladesh declared the name of the awardees in Bangladesh Gazette on 15 December 1973. This list has been prepared on the base of the Gazette. Additionally, two army officer's-Major General Chowdhury Hasan Sarwardy and Brigadier General Mozzafor Ahmed was decorated with this award during the conflict in Chittagong Hill Tracts.

Liberation War

Bangladesh Army

Former East Pakistan Rifles

Bangladesh Navy

Bangladesh Air Force

Bangladesh Police

Civilian recipients

Sector-2

Sector-4

Sector-5

Sector-6

Sector-7

Sector-8

Sector-9

Sector-11

Post Liberation War

Bangladesh Army

See also
 Bir Shreshtho
 Bir Uttam
 Bir Protik

References

Military awards and decorations of Bangladesh
Recipients of the Bir Bikrom